What Am I Gonna Do may refer to

"What Am I Gonna Do," single by Tyrese
"What Am I Gonna Do", single for Bobby Bare Sr, written by Carole King and Toni Stern, also a single for Kenny Rogers and the First Edition
"What Am I Gonna Do", song by Neil Sedaka from the album Neil Sedaka Sings Little Devil and His Other Hits, written by  Sedaka & Greenfield  also recorded by Billy Fury
"What Am I Gonna Do (I'm So in Love with You)", single from Body Wishes
"What Am I Gonna Do", single by Rod Stewart, written by R. Stewart, Davis, Brock
"What Am I Gonna Do", song written by D. Parks, B. Edward, performed by Bucks Fizz, the B-side of My Camera Never Lies 
"What Am I Gonna Do?", a song by Irving Berlin
What Am I Gonna Do (With the Rest of My Life) song by Merle Haggard

See also
What Am I Gonna Do About You 1986 album by Reba McEntire
What Am I Gonna Do with You song recorded by Barry White
What Am I Gonna Do About You (song) song written by Jim Allison, Doug Gilmore, and Bob Simon